Bolivia competed at the 1992 Summer Olympics in Barcelona, Spain. Thirteen competitors, eight men and five women, took part in eighteen events in six sports.

Competitors
The following is the list of number of competitors in the Games.

Athletics

Men's 5,000 metres
Policarpio Calizaya
 Heat — 15:02.02 (→ did not advance)

Men's 10,000 metres
Policarpio Calizaya
 Heat — 30:27.01 (→ did not advance)

Men's Marathon
 Juan Camacho — 2:26.01 (→ 57th place)

Women's 200 metres
 Jacqueline Soliz
 Heat — did not advance

Women's 400 metres
 Jacqueline Soliz
 Heat — did not advance

Women's 10,000 metres
Sandra Cortez
 Heat — did not start (→ did not advance)

Women's 4x400 metres Relay
 Jacqueline Soliz, Sandra Antelo, Gloria Burgos, and Moré Galetovic 
 Heat — did not advance

Cycling

One male cyclists represented Bolivia in 1992.

Men's sprint
 Pedro Vaca

Men's 1 km time trial
 Pedro Vaca

Judo

Men's Competition
 Eric Bustos
 Carlos Noriega

Shooting

Men's Competition
 Luis Gamarra

Swimming

Men's 200m Freestyle
 Luis Héctor Medina
 Heat – 2:00.87 (→ did not advance, 46th place)

Men's 400m Freestyle
 Luis Héctor Medina
 Heat – 4:11.77 (→ did not advance, 41st place)

Men's 100m Butterfly
 Luis Héctor Medina
 Heat – 1:01.14 (→ did not advance, 63rd place)

Women's 50m Freestyle
 Paola Peñarrieta
 Heat – 29.71 (→ did not advance, 48th place)

Women's 100m Freestyle
 Paola Peñarrieta
 Heat – 1:04.08 (→ did not advance, 47th place)

Women's 200m Freestyle
 Paola Peñarrieta
 Heat – 2:15.74 (→ did not advance, 37th place)

Weightlifting

See also
 Bolivia at the 1991 Pan American Games

References

External links
Official Olympic Reports

Nations at the 1992 Summer Olympics
1992
Summer Olympics